Euomphalia is a genus of air-breathing land snails, terrestrial pulmonate gastropod mollusks in the subfamily Trochulininae of the family Hygromiidae, the hairy snails and their allies.

Species
Species within the genus Euomphalia include:
 Euomphalia aristata (Krynicki, 1836)
 Euomphalia bactriana (Hutton, 1849)
 Euomphalia mediata (Westerlund, 1888)
 Euomphalia strigella (Draparnaud, 1801)
Subgenera and species brought into synonymy
 Euomphalia (Euomphalia) Westerlund, 1889 synonym of Euomphalia Westerlund, 1889
 Euomphalia (Harmozica) maiae (Hudec & Lezhawa, 1969): synonym of Batumica maiae (Hudec & Lezhawa, 1969) (original combination)
 Euomphalia (Hesseola) Lindholm, 1927 synonym of Hesseola Lindholm, 1927 (original rank)
 Euomphalia (Lindholmomneme) F. Haas, 1936 synonym of Lindholmomneme F. Haas, 1936 (original rank)
 Euomphalia (Micromphalia) Lindholm, 1927 synonym of Stenomphalia Lindholm, 1927 (inavailable; a junior homonym of Micromphalia Ancey, 1882)
  Euomphalia (Oscarboettgeria) Lindholm, 1927 synonym of Oscarboettgeria Lindholm, 1927 (original rank)
 Euomphalia (Stenomphalia) Lindholm, 1927 synonym of Stenomphalia Lindholm, 1927
 Euomphalia (Stenomphalia) turcica Schütt, 1985 † synonym of Stenomphalia turcica (Schütt, 1985) † (Stenomphalia is considered a distinct genus)
 Euomphalia sprattiana (De Stefani in De Stefani et al., 1891) † synonym of Monacha sprattiana (De Stefani in De Stefani et al., 1891) †

References

  Bank, R. A. (2017). Classification of the Recent terrestrial Gastropoda of the World. Last update: July 16, 2017

External links

Hygromiidae